Marjorie Pizer (1920 – 4 January 2016) was an Australian poet.

Life 
Pizer was born in Melbourne and studied literature at the University of Melbourne from 1939, graduating with a Bachelor of Arts. Pizer began her working life as a clerk in the public service. She met and married the poet Muir Holburn (q.v.) and they left for Sydney, where they became members of the Communist Party (until the invasion of Hungary). In 1947 they set up Pinchgut Press in a spare room. She was enamoured of poetry since a young age before beginning to compose her own works.

Bibliography 
Creeve Roe, Poems of Victor Daley; co-editor with Muir Holburn, 1947
Freedom on the Wallaby, Poems of the Australian People; editor, 1953
The Men Who Made Australia, Stories and Poems by Henry Lawson; editor, 1957
co-editor with Joan Reed, Come Listen, Poetry for Schools, Sydney : Angus and Robertson, 1966. 
Thou and I, Poems, 1967
To Life, Poems, Sydney : M. Pizer, 1969. 
Tides Flow, Poems, 1972
Seasons of Love, Poems, Sydney : Pinchgut Press, 1975. , 
Full Summer, Poems, Sydney : Pinchgut Press, 1977. , 
Gifts and Remembrances, Poems, Sydney : Pinchgut Press, 1979. , 
To You the Living, Poems of Bereavement and Loss, 1981, 1991, 1992, 2010
The Sixtieth Spring, Poems, Sydney : Pinchgut Press, 1982. , 
Below the Surface, Reflections on Life and Living; co-authored with Anne Spencer Parry, 1982, 1990, 1994
Selected Poems, 1963-1983, 1984
Poems of Lesbia Harford; co-editor with Drusilla Modjeska, 1985
Equinox, Poems, 1987
Fire in the Heart, Poems, Sydney : Pinchgut Press, 1990. , 
Journeys, Poems, Sydney : Pinchgut Press, 1992. , 
Winds of Change, Poems, Sydney : Pinchgut Press, 1995. , 
Await the Spring, Poems, 1998
A Fortunate Star, Poems, Sydney, N.S.W. : Pinchgut Press, 2001. , 
A Poet's Life, Poems, 2006, 2010
Poems, Poems, 2010

References

A lifetime's resources to call on (SMH, August 2006)
The Pinchgut Press

1920 births
2016 deaths
Australian poets
University of Melbourne alumni